The 1897 season in Swedish football, starting January 1897 and ending December 1897:

Honours

Official titles

Competitions

Domestic results

Svenska Mästerskapet 1897 
Final

References 
Print

Online

 
Seasons in Swedish football